Ilyata is a rural locality (a village) in Andreyevskoye Rural Settlement, Kishertsky District, Perm Krai, Russia. The population was 66 as of 2010.

Geography 
Ilyata is located 23 km northeast of Ust-Kishert (the district's administrative centre) by road. Petryata is the nearest rural locality.

References 

Rural localities in Kishertsky District